A literary award or literary prize is an award presented in recognition of a particularly lauded literary piece or body of work. It is normally presented to an author. This is a list of notable literary awards awarded in Germany.

By state

Baden-Württemberg 

 Berthold-Auerbach-Literaturpreis
 Bodensee-Literaturpreis
 Droste-Preis
 Feuergriffel
 Johann-Friedrich-von-Cotta-Literatur- und Übersetzerpreis der Landeshauptstadt Stuttgart
 Johann-Peter-Hebel-Plakette
 Johann-Peter-Hebel-Preis
 Ludwig-Uhland-Preis
 Mörike-Preis der Stadt Fellbach
 Peter-Härtling-Preis
 Peter-Huchel-Preis
 Preis der SWR-Bestenliste
 Thaddäus-Troll-Preis

Bavaria 

 August-Graf-von-Platen-Preis
 Bayerischer Kunstförderpreis
 Bayerischer Poetentaler
 Carl-Amery-Literaturpreis
 Ernst-Toller-Preis
 Friedrich-Märker-Preis
 Friedrich-Rückert-Preis
 Großer Literaturpreis der Bayerischen Akademie der Schönen Künste
 Großer Preis der Deutschen Akademie für Kinder- und Jugendliteratur e.V. Volkach
 Irseer Pegasus
 Jakob-Wassermann-Literaturpreis
 Jean-Paul-Preis
 Landshuter Jugendbuchpreis
 Literaturpreis der Stadt München
 Literaturpreis der Wilhelm und Christine Hirschmann-Stiftung
 Marie Luise Kaschnitz Prize
 Penzberger Urmel
 Willibald-Pirckheimer-Medaille

Berlin 
 Alex-Wedding-Preis
 Karl-Preusker-Medaille

Brandenburg 
 Fontane Prize of the City of Neuruppin

Bremen 
 Albatros Literaturpreis

Hessen 

 Brothers Grimm Prize of the City of Hanau
 Brothers Grimm Prize of the University of Marburg
 Einhard-Preis
 Frauenkrimipreis der Stadt Wiesbaden
 Georg-Christoph-Lichtenberg-Preis
 George-Konell-Preis
 Goethe Prize
 Hessischer Leseförderpreis
 Holzhäuser Heckethaler
 Janusz-Korczak-Preis
 Johann-Heinrich-Merck-Preis
 Leonce-und-Lena-Preis
 Literaturpreis der Universitätsstadt Marburg und des Landkreises Marburg-Biedenkopf
 Mannheimer Heinrich-Vetter-Literaturpreis
 Phantastik-Preis der Stadt Wetzlar
 Rheingau Literatur Preis
 Ricarda-Huch-Preis
 Wolfgang Weyrauch Prize

Alphabetically

A 

 Adelbert von Chamisso Prize
 Alemannischer Literaturpreis
 Alfred Döblin Prize
 Alfred-Döblin-Stipendium
 Alfred-Kerr-Preis
 Alfred-Müller-Felsenburg-Preis
 Andreas Gryphius Prize
 Anna Seghers-Preis
 Aspekte-Literaturpreis
 Astrid-Lindgren-Preis

B 

 Bertelsmann-Preisausschreiben
 Bettina-von-Arnim-Preis
 Bertolt-Brecht-Literaturpreis
 Büchergilde-Essaypreis
 Georg Büchner Prize
 Buxtehude Bull

C 

 Calw Hermann Hesse Prize
 Candide Preis
 Caroline-Schlegel-Preis
 Christian-Wagner-Preis
 Clemens-Brentano-Preis
 Corine Literature Prize

D 

 Dedalus-Preis für Neue Literatur
 DeLiA
 Deutsche Schillerstiftung
 Deutscher Bücherpreis
 Deutscher Erzählerpreis (2008)
 Deutscher Fantasy Preis
 Deutscher Hörbuchpreis
 Deutscher Jugendliteraturpreis
 Deutscher Jugendtheaterpreis
 Deutscher Krimi Preis
 Deutscher Kritikerpreis
 Deutscher Science Fiction Preis
 Deutscher Vorlesepreis

E 

 Egon Erwin Kisch Prize
 Eichendorff-Literaturpreis
 Elisabeth-Engelhardt-Literaturpreis
 Erich Fromm Prize
 Erik-Reger-Preis
 Ernst Reuter Prize
 Ernst-Hoferichter-Preis
 Ernst-Meister-Preis für Lyrik
 Ernst-Robert-Curtius-Preis
 Eugen-Helmlé-Übersetzerpreis
 Europäischer Übersetzerpreis Offenburg
 Evangelischer Buchpreis

F 

 F.-C.-Weiskopf-Preis
 Fontane Prize of the City of Neuruppin
 Förderpreis für Literatur der Landeshauptstadt Düsseldorf
 Frankfurter Anthologie
 Franz-Hessel-Preis
 Friedlandpreis der Heimkehrer
 Friedrich Nietzsche Prize
 Friedrich-Baur-Preis
 Friedrich-Gundolf-Preis
 Friedrich-Hölderlin-Preis

G 

 Georg Dehio Book Prize
 German Book Prize
 Gerrit-Engelke-Preis
 Geschwister-Scholl-Preis
 Goethe Prize
 Goldene Leslie
 Grimmelshausen-Preis
 Guntram and Irene Rinke Foundation

H 

 Hans Fallada Prize
 Hans-Erich-Nossack-Preis
 Hanseatic Goethe Prize
 Heinrich Heine Prize
 Heinrich-Böll-Preis
 Heinrich-Droste-Literaturpreis
 Heinrich-Heine-Preis des Ministeriums für Kultur der DDR
 Heinrich-Schmidt-Barrien-Preis
 Heinrich-Wolgast-Preis
 Helen and Kurt Wolff Translator's Prize
 Hermann-Hesse-Literaturpreis
 Hermann-Lenz-Preis
 Hoffmann von Fallersleben Prize
 Hölty Prize
 Hörbuchbestenliste
 Hörspielpreis der Kriegsblinden
 Horst Bienek Prize for Poetry
 Hubert-Burda-Preis für junge Lyrik
 Hugo-Jacobi-Preis

I 

 Ida-Dehmel-Literaturpreis
 Immermann-Preis
 Ingeborg-Drewitz-Literaturpreis für Gefangene
 International Literature Award
 Ist das Ihr Fahrrad, Mr. O'Brien?
 Italo-Svevo-Preis

J 

 Johannes-Saß-Preis
 Joseph-Breitbach-Preis

K 

 Kalbacher Klapperschlange
 Kalckhoff Medal
 Karl Jaspers Prize
 Karl-Vossler-Preis
 Kassel Literary Prize
 Kleist Prize
 KölnLiteraturPreis
 Kranichsteiner Literaturpreis
 Kurd Laßwitz Award
 Kuriosester Buchtitel des Jahres
 Kurt-Tucholsky-Preis

L 

 Leipzig Book Fair Prize
 Lessing Prize of the Free State of Saxony
 Lettre Ulysses Award
 Lion-Feuchtwanger-Preis
 Literaturpreis der Konrad-Adenauer-Stiftung
 Literaturpreis der Stadt Bremen
 Literaturpreis des Kulturkreises der deutschen Wirtschaft
 Literaturpreis Prenzlauer Berg
 Ludwig Börne Prize

M 

 Heinrich Mann Prize
 Mannheimer Heinrich-Vetter-Literaturpreis
 Margarete-Schrader-Preis
 Marieluise-Fleißer-Preis
 MDR-Literaturpreis
 MIMI

N 

 NDR Kultur Sachbuchpreis
 Nelly Sachs Prize
 Nicolas Born Prize

P 

 Petrarca-Preis
 Phantastik-Preis der Stadt Wetzlar
 Poetik-Professur an der Universität Bamberg
 Preis der Literaturhäuser
 Preis der Stadt Münster für Europäische Poesie

Q-R 

 Quickborn-Preis
 Rainer-Malkowski-Preis
 Roswitha Prize

S 

 Schiller Memorial Prize
 Schubart-Literaturpreis
 Siegfried Unseld Preis
 Sigmund Freud Prize

T 

 Thomas Mann Prize
 Thüringer Literaturpreis
 Toucan Prize

V-Z 

 Victor Otto Stomps-Preis
 Volks-Schillerpreis
 Wilhelm Raabe Literature Prize
 Wissenschaftsbuch des Jahres
 Würth-Literaturpreis
 Würth-Preis für Europäische Literatur
 Carl Zuckmayer Medal

See also

 List of literary awards
 List of poetry awards
 List of the world's richest literary prizes
 Literary festival
 Vanity award